St. John the Baptist is a historic church in New Bedford, Massachusetts, and a former parish of the Roman Catholic Church in the  Diocese of Fall River. At its closure, it had been the oldest Portuguese-American parish in the United States.

History 
St. John the Baptist parish was founded in 1871 to serve the Portuguese community in the area, becoming the second parish in New Bedford.

Portuguese immigration declined in the early 21st century, and later generations moved beyond New Bedford and Fall River, even as the cost of maintaining the historic church continued to rise. In 2009, the parish and finance councils asked the Diocese to evaluate its viability. The diocese set goals for membership and activity, but the parish failed to meet them, and in March 2012, its closure was announced. The parish was merged with that of nearby Our Lady of Mount Carmel, and the church shuttered in November.

Building
The first church, dedicated in 1875, was destroyed by fire in 1908. The present Romanesque style church with Byzantine elements was built in 1913 to the designs of Boston architect Matthew Sullivan.

References

External links 
 Diocese of Fall River

Roman Catholic churches in Massachusetts
Romanesque Revival church buildings in Massachusetts
Roman Catholic churches completed in 1913
Portuguese-American culture in Massachusetts
Religious organizations established in 1871
1871 establishments in Massachusetts
Christian organizations disestablished in 2012
20th-century Roman Catholic church buildings in the United States